The Lefaucheux M1858 was a French military revolver developed for the navy, chambered for the 12 mm pinfire cartridge, and based on a design by Casimir Lefaucheux and his son, Eugene (also a gun designer). The 1854 model was the first metallic-cartridge revolver adopted by a national government; the 1858 was the first variant fielded. It was first issued in 1858 by the French Navy (as either the Lefaucheux de Marine mle 1858 or simply M1858), and though never issued by the French Army, it was used in limited numbers by the French Cavalry during their 1862 deployment to Mexico. 

The 1858 was later upgraded in the late 1860s as the Lefaucheux de Marine 1870. It was accepted by the French Navy, but only 150 copies were delivered by 1872. Models of the 1858 were also purchased by Spain, Sweden, Italy, Russia, and Norway. Most were produced either at the state arsenal Manufacture d'armes de Saint-Étienne (MAS), Liège, Belgium, or local producers under license. The revolver was sold to the civilian market as well. Most military models were produced only with single-action, whereas civilian models were made primarily with double action.

Design

The revolver was a six-shot open framed design, which was loaded via a hinged gate on the right side of the frame, through which empty cartridges were also ejected via an ejector rod running along the barrel.

The LeFaucheux M1854 was one of the few foreign-manufactured weapons to have been imported by the U.S. government during the American Civil War. Over 11,000 were ordered by Federal authorities for cavalry use, with most of these serving in the Western Theater. This number surpasses that of many American-manufactured arms and makes the LeFaucheux M1854 a significant U.S. martial arm of the period. Although not imported by the Confederacy, some Southern officers are known to have carried LeFaucheux M1858 Revolvers.

Variants

The Danish military fielded the Lefaucheux-Francotte M1865/97 in 11.45mm center fire.

Archaeology

A western style pistol along with bullets and other related items were recovered in the Japanese artificial island of Dejima, a Dutch United East Indies Company settlement in Japan. They were found outside the wall of the Kapitan's (Captain's) quarters. The Kapitan is the Director of Dejima Factory.

"The pistol is 31 cm in overall length with a caliber of 1.3 cm, a revolver of the type invented in the mid 19th century by the Frenchman Lefaucheux."

A Lefaucheux revolver thought to be the one with which the artist Vincent Van Gogh shot himself in the chest, resulting in his death two days later, was found proximate to the site of the self-shooting in a wheatfield near Paris more than 70 years later.

References

External links
Lefaucheux M 1854 revolver (infographic tech. drawing)
http://s144812367.onlinehome.fr (www.lefaucheux.net)

American Civil War weapons
Casimir Lefaucheux
Revolvers of France
Double-action revolvers
Early revolvers
Black-powder pistols